Discovery of Love is a 2014 South Korean television series starring Jung Yu-mi, Eric Mun, and Sung Joon. It aired on KBS2 from August 18 to October 7, 2014, on Mondays and Tuesdays at 21:55 for 16 episodes.

Plot
Han Yeo-reum (Jung Yu-mi) is a furniture designer who owns a workshop space that she shares with other designers. For the past year, she's been dating Nam Ha-jin (Sung Joon), a plastic surgeon with a sweet and gentle personality. But Yeo-reum's peaceful existence is shaken when her ex-boyfriend Kang Tae-ha (Eric Mun) suddenly reappears in her life. The CEO of an interior design company, Tae-ha is a smart, confident man with a strong competitive edge who always gets what he wants. Meanwhile, Ha-jin comes across Ahn Ah-rim (Yoon Jin-yi), whom he recognizes as the girl he treated like a sister when they were both children living in an orphanage. As she begins working with Tae-ha, Yeo-reum is forced to re-evaluate her romantic history, which sets her off on a search for true love.

Cast
Jung Yu-mi as Han Yeo-reum
Eric Mun as Kang Tae-ha
Sung Joon as Nam Ha-jin
Yoon Jin-yi as Ahn Ah-rim
Yoon Hyun-min as Do Joon-ho
Kim Seul-gi as Yoon Sol
Kim Hye-ok as Shin Yoon-hee
Ahn Suk-hwan as Bae Min-soo
Lee Seung-joon as Yoon Jung-mok
Sung Byung-sook as Ha-jin's mother
Gu Won as Choi Eun-kyu
Jung Soo-young as Jang Gi-eun
Nam Kyung-eup as Han Jae-shik
Choi Hee as Ha-jin's blind date
Park Ah-in as Da-yeon 
Jung Yoon-seok as Han Woo-joo
Lee Moon-sik as Taxi driver (recurring cameo)
Jung Joo-ri as Plastic surgery patient (cameo, ep 2)
Cha Yu-ram as Tae-ha's billiards instructor (cameo, ep 4)
 Ahn Gil-kang as Man holding boxes of accessories (cameo, ep 5)
Yoo Ah-in as Woodworking class student (cameo, ep 16)

Production
This was the second acting collaboration of Jung Yu-mi and Eric Mun, seven years after Que Sera, Sera in 2007. Jung and Sung Joon had also previously worked with screenwriter Jung Hyun-jung on I Need Romance 2012 (2012) and I Need Romance 3 (2014), respectively.

It was also Mun's first television series three years since Spy Myung-wol (2011), about which he explained, "There was the period when I was at the army and also the period I promoted with Shinhwa. It wasn't that I was purposely not appearing in any dramas, but Shinhwa promotions were important. I also think I didn't discover a project that I really wanted to do."

Ratings
Despite the single-digit television ratings, the drama recorded ratings as high as 31.3% on Tving, a mobile and internet streaming site for live television. This figure was more than double the percentage of its competition. However these figures are not included in TNmS or AGB Nielsen ratings.

Awards and nominations

Webtoon adaptation
The webtoon adaptation of the series was confirmed. The series has created a fandom to the point where it has been called the "standard of romantic comedy" until now. Interest is gathered in how the charm of the refreshing romantic comedy genre will be conveyed through the webtoon adaptation.

References

External links
  
 
 
 

2014 South Korean television series debuts
2014 South Korean television series endings
Korean Broadcasting System television dramas
Korean-language television shows
South Korean romantic comedy television series
South Korean television series remade in other languages
Television series by JS Pictures